Ring of steel may refer to:

 Ring of Steel (film), a 1942 Army recruiting film narrated by Spencer Tracy
 Ring of Steel (Kabul), a series of 25 Afghan National Police checkpoints in central Kabul
 Ring of Steel: Germany and Austria-Hungary at War, 1914–1918, an award-winning book on World War I by Alexander Watson
 Traffic and Environmental Zone (also the "ring of steel"), the security and surveillance cordon surrounding the City of London